Exceptionality may refer to:

Exceptionalism
Special education

See also
Exception (disambiguation)